The Ocala Group is a geologic group in Florida. It preserves fossils dating back to the Paleogene period.

See also

 List of fossiliferous stratigraphic units in Florida

References
 

Geologic groups of Florida